Mahendranath Dekaphukan (1903–1974) or Monai Boiragi in full Mahendra Nath Moi Heng Dang Deka Phukan was an artist, poet, journalist and craftsman of Assam. He was the elder son of Lakshminath Phukan of Guwahati. After schooling from Cotton Collegiate High School, he took adminission at Cotton College. He left from home in mid of study and wandered many places. He was assistant editor of Rangoon Mail, published from Rangoon. He came to attach The London Art Co., when he was in Myanmar, and made some experimental films, but he couldn't store for future. After that he joined Assam Bengal Press of Kolkata as manager. He was never staying many days one place. After few years working he came to Assam and married a Christian woman Miss Claris, he named her Jyotirmoi Devi. His attire was like a general village folk of Assam.

He was some strange kind of personality, had a few intimate friends. On the other hand, like Madhav Chandra Bezbaruah, Bishnu Rabha, Industrialist Aalamohan Das, Dr. Sujya Kumar Bhuyan, former chief minister Bimala Prasad Chaliha etc., some were very intimate to him. One of his existing creations is the symbol of Cotton College, Guwahati, but most of his works couldn't be stored. A hostel in Cotton College established in his memory named Mahendra Nath Deka Phukan or (MNDP)

References

1903 births
1974 deaths
People from Kamrup Metropolitan district
Journalists from Assam
Artists from Guwahati